Lipovec is a small village east of Dolenja Vas in the Municipality of Ribnica in southern Slovenia. The area is part of the traditional region of Lower Carniola and is now included in the Southeast Slovenia Statistical Region.

A small chapel-shrine in the centre of the settlement is dedicated to the Virgin Mary and was built around 1930.

References

External links

Lipovec on Geopedia

Populated places in the Municipality of Ribnica